Clonmoyle House was a country house in the townland of Clonmoyle East, situated  south-east of Aghabullogue village and  north-east of Coachford village. The house and demesne was one of several eighteenth and nineteenth century estates built in mid-Cork along the valley of the River Lee and its tributaries.

The Archaeological Inventory of County Cork (1997) describes Clonmoyle House as an abandoned two-storey country house, depicted as rectangular on the 1841 surveyed OS map, but later remodelled and enlarged by the addition of bows to side elevations and rear hipped-roof projections. An entrance front existed of three bays, with side-lights and sash windows. A roofless farm building was located to the north-west.

Clonmoyle House was once a Colthurst family residence. In A Topographical Dictionary of Ireland (Lewis, 1837) the parish of Aghabologue is described as containing numerous "large and elegant houses", including "Clonmoyle, the seat of C. Colthurst, Esq". Agriculture was said to have locally improved by the exertions of Colthurst and other proprietors, who introduced a system of irrigation, drainage, and a culture of green crops. The tithe applotment book for the townland of Clonmoyle East records "Charles Colthurst, Esq." as occupying 36 acres. Colthurst was the son of John Colthurst and Jane Bowen. The Ordnance Survey name book of  refers to a demesne on the southern side of Clonmoyle East, containing "Clonmoyle House and Cottage, interspersed with trees, some plantation and ornamental ground". It is described as a fine house with good "offices", being the residence of Chas. Colthurst Esq., and with the River Dripsey bounding the property to the east and south. Clonmoyle House and its demesne are depicted on the 1841 surveyed OS Map, including a fish pond, weir, waterfall and wooden bridge.

By the mid-nineteenth century, the Primary Valuation of Ireland (Griffith's Valuation) records Jonathan Bruce as occupier of Clonmoyle, comprising  acres and described as a "house, offices, gate lodge and land", with the lessor being Charles Colthurst. During the second half of the nineteenth century, the house was occupied by Henry Leader, builder of nearby Leader's Aqueduct, and whose businesses were said to include a local furze mill for the fattening of pigs. Leader possessed approximately 2418 acres in County Cork during the 1870s. The 1901 surveyed OS Map depicts a remodelled Clonmoyle House and surrounding demesne, to include a gate lodge, pond and boat house.

The Irish Tourist Association survey of 1944 confirms Clonmoyle House as the residence of a Mrs Young, who "also owned nearby Clonmoyle Flour Mill". The house was thought to have been erected some 150 years previously. It was described as having an "excellently constructed interior, wide staircase and with the moulding of its doors and window shutters" being a noticeable feature.

Today, the house is in a ruinous condition and its surroundings neglected. The former fish pond and features appear infilled and the southern end is occupied by now vacant industrial premises and surrounds.

See also
Clonmoyle Mill
Leader's Aqueduct
Cottage House, Clonmoyle
Athnanangle Bridge
Luskin's Bridge

References

Country houses in Ireland